Hawala is a 2019 Indian Telugu-language thriller web series written and directed by Kowshik Bheemidi. Produced by Rahul Tamada and Saideep Reddy Borra, it stars Gourish Nandan Yeleti, Anusha, Jayasree Kshatriya and Tarun Rohit in lead roles. This six-episode series premiered on 21 November 2019 on ZEE5. It is dubbed into other Indian languages.

Premise 
After winning a huge sum of money through cricket betting, Karan (Gourish Nandan Yeleti) gives the Hawala note to Vani (Anusha), for safekeeping. However, they soon realise that another couple, Guna (Tarun Rohit) and Nisha (Jayasree Kshatriya), have stolen the Hawala note and encashed the money. As the chase begins to locate Guna and Nisha, the couple Karan and Vani find themselves in unexpected situations, as they begin to unearth the unexposed world of Hawala.

Cast 

 Gourish Nandan Yeleti as Karan
 Anusha as Vani
 Jayasree Kshatriya as Nisha
 Tarun Rohit as Guna
 Anvesh Alluri
 Kushal Goud
 Senegal Patel
 Kowshik Bheemidi
 Nikhil Reddy
 Amar Patel

Episodes

Release 
The series was released on ZEE5 on 21 November 2019.

References

External links 

 
 Hawala on ZEE5

2019 web series debuts
2019 web series endings
Telugu-language web series
2019 Indian television series debuts
2019 Indian television series endings
Indian thriller television series
Thriller web series
ZEE5 original programming